The Amami are islands in Kagoshima Prefecture, Japan.

Amami may also refer to:
 Amami Ōshima, a main island of the islands
 Amami, Kagoshima, a city in the islands
 Amami Airport, an airport serving the city
 Amami language
 Amami Station, a railway station in Osaka Prefecture
 Amami (film), a 1993 comedy film starring Moana Pozzi
 Amami (album)

People with the surname
, Japanese actress

See also
Amami rabbit
Amami thrush
Amami tip-nosed frog
Amami woodcock

Japanese-language surnames